Leinstrand is a former municipality in the old Sør-Trøndelag county, Norway. The  municipality existed from 1838 until its dissolution in 1964. The municipality of Leinstrand encompassed the south-central part of what is now the city of Trondheim in Trøndelag county. The administrative centre was located in the village of Heimdal, just west of the border with Tiller municipality. The local Leinstrand Church was built in 1673.

History

The municipality of Leinstrand was established on 1 January 1838 (see formannskapsdistrikt). According to the 1835 census, Leinstrand had a population of 1,165.  During the 1960s, there were many municipal mergers across Norway due to the work of the Schei Committee. On 1 January 1964, the neighboring municipalities of Byneset (population: 2,049), Leinstrand (population: 4,193), Strinda (population: 44,600), Tiller (population: 3,595), and the city of Trondheim (population: 56,982) were merged to form the new urban municipality of Trondheim which would have a total population of 111,419.

Name
The municipality (originally the parish) is named Leinstrand. The first element comes from the old Leinan farm.

Government
While it existed, this municipality was responsible for primary education (through 10th grade), outpatient health services, senior citizen services, unemployment, social services, zoning, economic development, and municipal roads. During its existence, this municipality was governed by a municipal council of elected representatives, which in turn elected a mayor.

Mayors
The mayors of Leinstrand:

 1838–1841: Mons Olsen Ekren
 1842–1843: John Andersen Busklein
 1844–1847: Mons Olsen Ekren
 1848–1849: John Andersen Busklein
 1850–1853: Andreas Seneppen
 1854–1855: Anders Liaklev
 1856–1859: John Andersen Busklein
 1860–1863: Andreas Seneppen
 1864–1869: Ole Evensen Stav
 1870–1871: Ole Johnsen Stav (V)
 1872–1883: Ole Evensen Stav (MV)
 1884–1885: Ole Olsen Klæt (H)
 1886–1891: John Andersen Kvaal
 1892–1897: Ole Olsen Klæt (H)
 1898–1901: Ole J. Ekren (V)
 1902–1922: Simon Leinum (V)
 1923–1925: Sigmund Berg (Bp)
 1926–1928: Simon Leinum (V)
 1929–1931: Peder Konrad Hustad (Bp)
 1932–1934: Ivar Hegstad (Bp)
 1935–1945: Ivar Skjetlein (Bp/NS)
 1945–1945: Leiv Qvenild (NS)
 1945–1955: Ole Andersen Klæt (Bp)
 1956–1959: Alf Alfnes (Ap)
 1960–1963: Ivar Sakshaug (Bp)

Municipal council
The municipal council  of Leinstrand was made up of representatives that were elected to four year terms. The party breakdown of the final municipal council was as follows:

See also
List of former municipalities of Norway

References

Former municipalities of Norway
Geography of Trondheim
1838 establishments in Norway
1964 disestablishments in Norway